Jatun Huiscana (possibly from Quechua hatun big, wisq'ana lock, wiskana a kind of pickaxe, "big lock" or "big pickaxe") is a mountain in the Urubamba mountain range in the Andes of  Peru, about  high. It lies in the Cusco Region, Calca Province, Lares District. Jatun Huiscana is situated northwest of Ccerayoc and Yanaorcco, and northeast of Sahuasiray.

References 

Mountains of Peru
Mountains of Cusco Region